Solid! Said the Earl is a 1948 comedy novel by the British writer John Paddy Carstairs, best known as a screenwriter and film director. An American serviceman unexpectedly inherits an English title and country estate.

Film adaptation
In 1955 it was made into the film A Yank in Ermine directed by Gordon Parry and starring Noelle Middleton and Diana Decker, with Carstairs adapting his own novel.

References

Bibliography
 Goble, Alan. The Complete Index to Literary Sources in Film. Walter de Gruyter, 1999.

1948 British novels
Novels set in England
British novels adapted into films
British comedy novels
Hurst and Blackett books